= 1930–31 Plunket Shield season =

Cricket tournament in New Zealand

1930–31 Plunket Shield
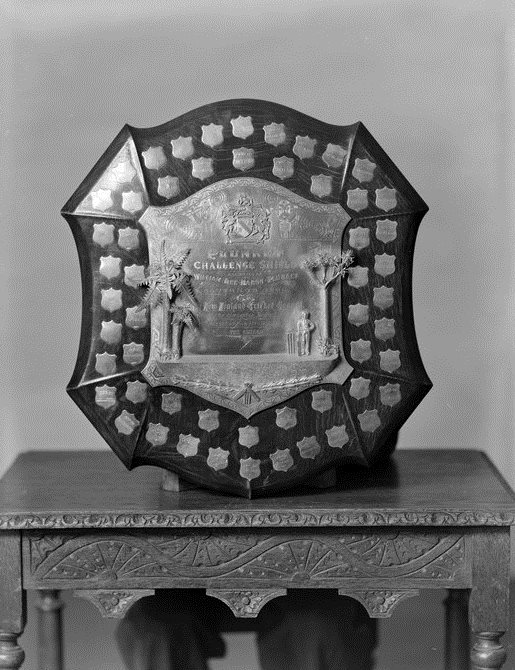
- The Plunket Shield trophy
- Cricket format: First-class
- Tournament format(s): Round-robin
- Champions: Canterbury (2nd title)
- Participants: 4
- Matches: 6

The 1930–31 Plunket Shield season was a tournament of the Plunket Shield, the domestic first-class cricket competition of New Zealand.

Canterbury won the championship, finishing at the top of the points table at the end of the round-robin tournament between the four first-class sides, Auckland, Canterbury, Otago and Wellington.

== Table ==
Below are the Plunket Shield standings for the season:

Team	Played	Won	Lost	Drawn	Points	NetRpW
Canterbury	3	3	0	0	24	9.193
Auckland	3	2	1	0	16	5.838
Wellington	3	1	2	0	8	-1.733
Otago	3	0	3	0	0	-12.263
